This is a list of lieutenant-governors of the North-Western Provinces and chief commissioners of Oudh. The provisional establishment of the joint title of Lieutenant-Governors of the North-Western Provinces and Chief Commissioners of Oudh happened in 1877 when title of Chief Commissioners of Oudh were merged until it was renamed as Governors of the United Provinces of British India in 1902.

Lieutenant-governors of the North-Western Provinces and Chief Commissioners of Oudh (1877–1902) 
In 1877 the office of lieutenant governor was combined with that of Chief Commissioner of Oudh, which had existed since 1857, in the same person.

 Sir George Ebenezer Wilson Couper, 15 February 1877 – 17 April 1882, continued
 Sir Alfred Comyn Lyall, 17 April 1882 – 21 November 1887
 Sir Auckland Colvin, 21 November 1887 – 28 November 1892
 Sir Charles Haukes Todd Crosthwaite, 28 November 1892 – 9 January 1895
 Alan Cadell, 9 January 1895 – 6 November 1895, acting
 Sir Anthony Patrick MacDonnell, 6 November 1895 – 14 November 1901
 Sir James John Digges La Touche, 14 November 1901 – 22 March 1902

See also 
 (1732–1857) - Nawabs of Awadh
 (1834–1836) - Governors of Agra
 (1836–1877) - Lieutenant Governors of the North-Western Provinces
 (1856–1877) - Chief Commissioners of Oudh
 (1902–1921) - Lieutenant Governors of the United Provinces of Agra and Oudh
 (1921–1937) - Governors of the United Provinces of British India
 (1937–1950) - Governors of the United Provinces
 (1950 – cont.) - Governors of Uttar Pradesh

References 

 Provinces of British India
 The India list and India Office list for 1905 By Great Britain, India Office

British administration in Uttar Pradesh
Lieutenant Governors